Macarena Andrea "Maca" Cabrillana Sanhueza (born 31 March 1992) is a Chilean wheelchair tennis player. She was the first Chilean wheelchair tennis player to compete in a Grand Slam when she competed at the 2021 Australian Open, she was a quarterfinalist in the singles event and a semifinalist in the doubles event. She has also a silver medal in the women's singles at the 2019 Parapan American Games.

Mental health struggle
When Cabrillana was 16, she jumped from the fifth floor of a building as a suicide attempt, she had L3 lumbar paraplegia following her fall and spent a month in hospital. She has spoken openly about living with depression.

Cabrillana was inspired to play tennis by watching Rafael Nadal and Nicolás Massú while growing up and during rehabilitation. She chose to take part in the tennis workshop with Chilean tennis player Hans Gildemeister's sister Doris who trained her once a week and Cabrillana enjoyed her sessions very much.

References

1992 births
Living people
Chilean female tennis players
Paralympic wheelchair tennis players of Chile
Wheelchair tennis players at the 2016 Summer Paralympics
Wheelchair tennis players at the 2020 Summer Paralympics
Medalists at the 2019 Parapan American Games
People from Santiago Province, Chile
21st-century Chilean women